Syed Ahmad Shah, better known by his pen name Ahmed Faraz, ( 12 January 1931 – 25 August 2008) was a Pakistani Urdu poet, scriptwriter and became the founding Director General (later Chairman) of Pakistan Academy of Letters. He wrote his poetry under the pseudonym Faraz. He criticised military rule and coup d'état in the country and was displaced by the military dictators.

Awards and recognition 
Ahmad Faraz was first awarded the Sitara-i-Imtiaz by the Government of Pakistan and then the Hilal-e-Imtiaz in 2004 by the then President of Pakistan Pervez Musharraf. He returned this award two years later in 2006 "as a means of protest against the actions of the Musharraf regime". 

On 25 August 2008, he died in Islamabad, and later Government of Pakistan conferred Hilal-e-Pakistan posthumously upon Faraz for his contribution to poetry and Urdu literature.

Early life
Faraz was born as Syed Ahmad Shah on 12 January 1931 in Kohat, a son of Syed Muhammad Shah Bark. His brother is Masood Kausar, an ex Governor of Khyber Pakhtunkhwa, Pakistan. He was of Pashtun ancestry and spoke Hindko as his first language.Faraz had earlier moved to Peshawar from Kohat District with his family. He studied at Edwardes College, Peshawar and received his Master's degree in Urdu and Persian from Peshawar University. During his college life, the two poets Faiz Ahmad Faiz and Ali Sardar Jafri influenced him and became Faraz's role models.

Literary work
Faraz is credited for writing Pas Andaaz, Sab Awazain Meri, Khuwab Gul, Janan Janan, and Ghazal Bahana Karoon.

Career
Singers like Mehdi Hassan, Noor Jehan, Ghulam Ali, Pankaj Udhas, Jagjit Singh and Runa Laila greatly popularized his poetry by singing his ghazals in films and in live concerts.

Ahmad Faraz served as Chairman of the National Book Foundation in Islamabad, Pakistan.

Political activity
Faraz was arrested for writing poems that criticised military rulers in Pakistan during the reign of General Zia-ul-Haq. Following that arrest, he went into a self-imposed exile. He stayed for 3 years in Britain, Canada, and Europe before returning to Pakistan, where he was initially appointed as Chairman of the Pakistan Academy of Letters and later chairperson of the Islamabad- based National Book Foundation for several years.

Death and legacy

Earlier in 2008, after a fall in Baltimore, Maryland, there were false rumors of his death while he was being treated in a Chicago hospital. But he was able to return to his homeland, Pakistan. Then later, Ahmad Faraz died of kidney failure, confirmed by his son Shibli Faraz, in a private hospital in Islamabad on 25 August 2008. His funeral was held on the evening of 26 August, among many admirers and government officials at H-8 Graveyard, Islamabad, Pakistan.

Ahmad Faraz is included in the long list of revolutionary poets of Urdu language and is "acclaimed as one of the most influential modern Urdu poets of the last century".

"This felicity with words is evident in much of Faraz's work, as is an economy of expression, along with an ability to wrap layers of meaning into brief lines, the hallmark of an artist who has a command over his craft".

See also
 List of Urdu-language writers

Notes

References

1931 births
2008 deaths
 
Deaths from kidney failure
People from Kohat District
Hindkowan people
Nigar Award winners
Recipients of Hilal-i-Imtiaz
Recipients of Sitara-i-Imtiaz
Pakistani Sunni Muslims
People from Islamabad
Pakistani progressives
Edwardes College alumni
University of Peshawar alumni
Urdu-language poets from Pakistan
Urdu-language theologians
20th-century poets
20th-century Urdu-language writers
21st-century Urdu-language writers